Letschert is a surname. Notable people with the surname include:

Rianne Letschert (born 1976), Dutch law scholar
Timo Letschert (born 1993), Dutch footballer